Lia Addadi (born 1950) is a professor of structural biology at the Weizmann Institute of Science. She works on crystallisation in biology, including biomineralization, interactions with cells and crystallisation in cell membranes. She was elected a member of the National Academy of Sciences (NAS) in 2017 for  “distinguished and continuing achievements in original research”, and the American Philosophical Society (2020).

Early life and education 

Addadi was born in Padua. She earned her bachelor's and master's degrees in chemistry at the University of Padua, and graduated in 1973. She moved to Rehovot for her PhD supervised by Meir Lahav on the synthesis of chiral polymers at the Weizmann Institute of Science, which she completed in 1979.

Research and career 
After her PhD, Addadi joined Jeremy R. Knowles at Harvard University. She started to work on crystal growth during her PhD, and by chance met Steve Weiner who was working on biomineralization. Together they investigated many biominerals, including demonstrating the matrix sheets of crystals in nacre (mother of pearl).

Addadi returned to the Weizmann Institute of Science as an Associate Professor in 1988. She was promoted to full professor in 1993 and Head of the Structural Biology in 1994. She works on ordered crystal arrays and mineralised tissues. She has investigated the relationship between acidic proteins with biominerals including calcite and apatite. She demonstrated that macromolecules in the shells of mollusks determines the polymorphism of aragonite and calcite. She went on to establish the role of amorphous calcium carbonate in biomineralisation. Addadi identified that mollusks build their shells using hydrophobic silk gels, aspartic acid, acid rich proteins and an amorphous precursor.

Addadi is interested in how macromolecules nucleate oriented growth, and how morphology changes through interactions with surfaces. Addadi looks at the structures of crystal protein composites. She demonstrated that protein intercalation into the lattice can changes the texture and mechanical properties of the material. She showed that immunoglobulins and serum albumins can selectively adhere to the surfaces of crystals and nucleate further crystal growth. This can help too understand how diseases such as gout, osteoarthritis and atherosclerosis form crystals in body fluids. Addadi studies the formation pathways of these mineralised tissues in foraminifera and zebrafish bone. She was the first woman to win the ETH Zurich prelog prize in 1989. She was appointed dean of the faculty of chemistry in 2001.

Her work has considered molecular recognition at crystal interfaces. When introduced to an organism, crystals appear as highly structured, repetitive macromolecular substrates. She studies monoclonal antibodies that are sensitive to specific crystalline organisations. She also investigates cross-talk between crystals and the biological environments they exist in.

Her inaugural year article for Proceedings of the National Academy of Sciences of the United States of America (PNAS) considered the formation of cholesterol crystals in atherosclerosis. She demonstrated that in cell culture crystals adopt a similar shape to the atherosclerotic plaque that forms in cells, because they are formed from the same cholesterol. The crystals adopt helical or tubular forms. Addadi used stochastic optical reconstruction microscopy and soft X-ray tomography to identify the cholesterol inside cells.

Awards and honours 
 1986 Weizmann Institute of Science Ernst David Bergmann prize in Chemistry
 1989 Israel Chemical Society Annual Award
 1996 NIDR Prize for Distinguished Scientists
 1998 ETH Zurich Prelog Medal in Stereochemistry
 2006 Technion – Israel Institute of Technology Kolthof prize 
 2009 Israel Chemical Society Prize for Excellence
 2011 Royal Swedish Academy of Sciences Gregori Aminoff Prize for Crystallography
 2017 Elected to the National Academy of Sciences
 2018 ETH Zurich Honorary Doctorate

References 

1950 births
Living people
Italian women scientists
Italian women chemists
Academic staff of Weizmann Institute of Science
Weizmann Institute of Science alumni
University of Padua alumni
Women biochemists
Members of the American Philosophical Society
Foreign associates of the National Academy of Sciences